Ulp1 peptidase (Smt3-protein conjugate proteinase, Ubl-specific protease 1, Ulp1, Ulp1 endopeptidase, Ulp1 protease) is an enzyme. This enzyme catalyses the following chemical reaction

 Hydrolysis of the alpha-linked peptide bond in the sequence Gly-Gly-!Ala-Thr-Tyr at the C-terminal end of the small ubiquitin-like modifier (SUMO) propeptide, Smt3

The enzyme from Saccharomyces cerevisiae can also recognize small ubiquitin-like modifier 1 (SUMO-1) from human.

References

External links 
 

EC 3.4.22